New Zealand has often been omitted from maps of the world, which has caught the attention of New Zealanders. It is considered that this is because of the widespread use of the Mercator projection, a map projection putting Europe in the center which leaves New Zealand in the bottom right-hand corner of maps, sometimes making it go overlooked by mapmakers, easily removed by an accidental crop, or simply not added for convenience, ignorance or laziness.

New Zealand has been excluded from maps at the National Museum of Natural History in Washington, D.C. in the United States, in IKEA stores, on the map of the board games Pandemic and Risk, on the map of the 2014 Nuclear Security Summit in which Prime Minister of New Zealand John Key participated, at a world map seal at the United Nations Office at Geneva in Switzerland, on the newspaper Daily Mail, on Government Executives newsletter Defense One, on the magazine Forbes, on the digital media platform Mashable, on the Pyongyang International Airport in North Korea and on the logo of the Flat Earth Society. It was also excluded from maps promoting the 2015 Rugby World Cup even though New Zealand was the then world champion.

This recurrent occurrence has become a meme for New Zealanders. There is a community on Tumblr titled World Maps Without New Zealand and a Reddit community known as r/MapsWithoutNZ both focused on this issue with 10,000 and 30,000 members respectively as of 2017. In 2019, a user in r/MapsWithoutNZ noticed that a map, "BJÖRKSTA world map", on sale for 30 dollars at an IKEA store on Washington, D.C., did not portray New Zealand. Subsequently, IKEA apologized and removed the product from its stores. On Reddit, there also are communities about the omission of Flevoland in the Netherlands, Hawaii in the United States and Tasmania in Australia from world maps.

The New Zealand Government has acknowledged this phenomenon, and it features a map of the world in which the country is deliberately not included on the 404 error page of its official website; the page states that "something's missing". Furthermore, in 2018, a tourism campaign video was published in which the Prime Minister of New Zealand Jacinda Ardern and the New Zealander actor and comedian Rhys Darby discussed why New Zealand was being left off world maps. On the video, Darby jokingly said that it was the result of a conspiracy against New Zealand. The video promoted the hashtag #getnzonthemap.

See also
 Omission of Tasmania from maps of Australia

References

External links
 
  on Reddit

World maps
Controversies in New Zealand
Internet memes introduced in 2014